The chemists Peter Debye and Erich Hückel noticed that solutions that contain ionic solutes do not behave ideally even at very low concentrations. So, while the concentration of the solutes is fundamental to the calculation of the dynamics of a solution, they theorized that an extra factor that they termed gamma is necessary to the calculation of the activity coefficients of the solution. Hence they developed the Debye–Hückel equation and Debye–Hückel limiting law. The activity is only proportional to the concentration and is altered by a factor known as the activity coefficient . This factor takes into account the interaction energy of ions in solution.

Debye–Hückel limiting law 

In order to calculate the activity  of an ion C in a solution, one must know the concentration and the activity coefficient:

where
  is the activity coefficient of C,
  is the concentration of the chosen standard state, e.g. 1 mol/kg if molality is used,
  is a measure of the concentration of C.
Dividing  with  gives a dimensionless quantity.

The Debye–Hückel limiting law enables one to determine the activity coefficient of an ion in a dilute solution of known ionic strength. The equation is

where
  is the charge number of ion species i,
  is the elementary charge,
  is the inverse of the Debye screening length (defined below),
  is the relative permittivity of the solvent,
  is the permittivity of free space,
  is the Boltzmann constant,
  is the temperature of the solution,
  is the Avogadro constant,
  is the ionic strength of the solution (defined below),
  is a constant that depends on temperature.

It is important to note that because the ions in the solution act together, the activity coefficient obtained from this equation is actually a mean activity coefficient.

The excess osmotic pressure obtained from Debye–Hückel theory is in cgs units:

Therefore, the total pressure is the sum of the excess osmotic pressure and the ideal pressure . The osmotic coefficient is then given by

Summary of Debye and Hückel's first article on the theory of dilute electrolytes
The English title of the article is "On the Theory of Electrolytes. I. Freezing Point Depression and Related Phenomena". It was originally published in 1923 in volume 24 of a German-language journal . An English translation of the article is included in a book of collected papers presented to Debye by "his pupils, friends, and the publishers on the occasion of his seventieth birthday on March 24, 1954". Another English translation was completed in 2019. The article deals with the calculation of properties of electrolyte solutions that are under the influence of ion-induced electric fields, thus it deals with electrostatics.

In the same year they first published this article, Debye and Hückel, hereinafter D&H, also released an article that covered their initial characterization of solutions under the influence of electric fields called "On the Theory of Electrolytes. II. Limiting Law for Electric Conductivity", but that subsequent article is not (yet) covered here.

In the following summary (as yet incomplete and unchecked), modern notation and terminology are used, from both chemistry and mathematics, in order to prevent confusion. Also, with a few exceptions to improve clarity, the subsections in this summary are (very) condensed versions of the same subsections of the original article.

Introduction
D&H note that the Guldberg–Waage formula for electrolyte species in chemical reaction equilibrium in classical form is

where
  is a notation for multiplication,
  is a dummy variable indicating the species,
  is the number of species participating in the reaction,
  is the mole fraction of species ,
  is the stoichiometric coefficient of species ,
 K is the equilibrium constant.

Fundamentals

Specifically, they split most of the thermodynamic potentials into classical and electrostatic terms:

where
  is Helmholtz free entropy,
  is entropy,
  is internal energy,
  is temperature,
  is Helmholtz free energy.

where
  is pressure,
  is volume.

By the definition of the total differential, this means that

which are useful further on.

As stated previously, the internal energy is divided into two parts:

where
  indicates the classical part,
  indicates the electric part.

Similarly, the Helmholtz free entropy is also divided into two parts:

D&H state, without giving the logic, that

It would seem that, without some justification,

Without mentioning it specifically, D&H later give what might be the required (above) justification while arguing that , an assumption that the solvent is incompressible.

The definition of the Gibbs free entropy  is

where  is Gibbs free energy.

At this point D&H note that, for water containing 1 mole per liter of potassium chloride (nominal pressure and temperature aren't given), the electric pressure  amounts to 20 atmospheres. Furthermore, they note that this level of pressure gives a relative volume change of 0.001. Therefore, they neglect change in volume of water due to electric pressure, writing

and put

D&H say that, according to Planck, the classical part of the Gibbs free entropy is

where
  is a species,
  is the number of different particle types in solution,
  is the number of particles of species i,
  is the particle specific Gibbs free entropy of species i,
  is the Boltzmann constant,
  is the mole fraction of species i.

Species zero is the solvent.

D&H don't say so, but the functional form for  may be derived from the functional dependence of the chemical potential of a component of an ideal mixture upon its mole fraction.

D&H note that the internal energy  of a solution is lowered by the electrical interaction of its ions, but that this effect can't be determined by using the crystallographic approximation for distances between dissimilar atoms (the cube root of the ratio of total volume to the number of particles in the volume). This is because there is more thermal motion in a liquid solution than in a crystal. The thermal motion tends to smear out the natural lattice that would otherwise be constructed by the ions. Instead, D&H introduce the concept of an ionic atmosphere or cloud. Like the crystal lattice, each ion still attempts to surround itself with oppositely charged ions, but in a more free-form manner; at small distances away from positive ions, one is more likely to find negative ions and vice versa.

The potential energy of an arbitrary ion solution
Electroneutrality of a solution requires that

where
  is the total number of ions of species i in the solution,
  is the charge number of species i.

If electric forces were the only factor in play, the minimal-energy configuration of all the ions would be achieved in a close-packed lattice configuration. However, the ions are in thermal equilibrium with each other and are relatively free to move. Thus they obey Boltzmann statistics and form a Boltzmann distribution. Thus at every point in the cloud

Note that in the infinite temperature limit, all ions are distributed uniformly, with no regard for their electrostatic interactions.

The charge density is related to the number density:

When combining this result for the charge density with the Poisson equation from electrostatics, a form of the Poisson–Boltzmann equation results:

This equation is difficult to solve and does not follow the principle of linear superposition for the relationship between the number of charges and the strength of the potential field. It has been solved by the Swedish mathematician Thomas Hakon Gronwall and his collaborators physicical chemists V. K. La Mer and Karl Sandved in a 1928 article from Physikalische Zeitschrift dealing with extensions to Debye–Huckel theory, which resorted to Taylor series expansion.

However, for sufficiently low concentrations of ions, a first-order Taylor series expansion approximation for the exponential function may be used ( for ) to create a linear differential equation (Hamann, Hamnett, and Vielstich. Electrochemistry. Wiley-VCH. section 2.4.2). D&H say that this approximation holds at large distances between ions, which is the same as saying that the concentration is low. Lastly, they claim without proof that the addition of more terms in the expansion has little effect on the final solution. Thus

The Poisson–Boltzmann equation is transformed to

because the first summation is zero due to electroneutrality.

Also, let  be the ionic strength of the solution:

So, the fundamental equation is reduced to a form of the Helmholtz equation:

Today,  is called the Debye screening length. D&H recognize the importance of the parameter in their article and characterize it as a measure of the thickness of the ion atmosphere, which is an electrical double layer of the Gouy–Chapman type.

The equation may be expressed in spherical coordinates by taking  at some arbitrary ion:

The equation has the following general solution (keep in mind that  is a positive constant):

The electric potential is zero at infinity by definition, so  must be zero.

In the next step, D&H assume that there is a certain radius , beyond which no ions in the atmosphere may approach the (charge) center of the singled out ion. This radius may be due to the physical size of the ion itself, the sizes of the ions in the cloud, and any water molecules that surround the ions. Mathematically, they treat the singled out ion as a point charge to which one may not approach within the radius .

The potential of a point charge by itself is

D&H say that the total potential inside the sphere is

where  is a constant that represents the potential added by the ionic atmosphere. No justification for  being a constant is given. However, one can see that this is the case by considering that any spherical static charge distribution is subject to the mathematics of the shell theorem. The shell theorem says that no force is exerted on charged particles inside a sphere (of arbitrary charge). Since the ion atmosphere is assumed to be (time-averaged) spherically symmetric, with charge varying as a function of radius , it may be represented as an infinite series of concentric charge shells. Therefore, inside the radius , the ion atmosphere exerts no force. If the force is zero, then the potential is a constant (by definition).

Thus

By the definition of electric potential energy, the potential energy associated with the singled out ion in the ion atmosphere is

Notice that this only requires knowledge of the charge of the singled out ion and the potential of all the other ions.

To calculate the potential energy of the entire electrolyte solution, one must use the multiple-charge generalization for electric potential energy:

The additional electric term to the thermodynamic potential

Nondimensionalization
The differential equation is ready for solution (as stated above, the equation only holds for low concentrations):

Using the Buckingham π theorem on this problem results in the following dimensionless groups:

 is called the reduced scalar electric potential field.  is called the reduced radius. The existing groups may be recombined to form two other dimensionless groups for substitution into the differential equation. The first is what could be called the square of the reduced inverse screening length, . The second could be called the reduced central ion charge,  (with a capital Z). Note that, though  is already dimensionless, without the substitution given below, the differential equation would still be dimensional.

The resulting equations are as follows:

Unfortunately, because of the boundary condition at infinity, regular perturbation does not work. The same boundary condition prevents us from finding the exact solution to the equations. Singular perturbation may work, however.

Experimental verification of the theory

To verify the validity of the Debye–Hückel theory, many experimental ways have been tried, measuring the activity coefficients: the problem is that we need to go towards very high dilutions.
Typical examples are: measurements of vapour pressure, freezing point, osmotic pressure (indirect methods) and measurement of electric potential in cells (direct method).
Going towards high dilutions good results have been found using liquid membrane cells, it has been possible to investigate aqueous media 10−4 M and it has been found that for 1:1 electrolytes (as NaCl or KCl) the Debye–Hückel equation is totally correct, but for 2:2 or 3:2 electrolytes it is possible to find negative deviation from the Debye–Hückel limit law: this strange behavior can be observed only in the very dilute area, and in more concentrate regions the deviation becomes positive.
It is possible that Debye–Hückel equation is not able to foresee this behavior because of the linearization of the Poisson–Boltzmann equation, or maybe not: studies about this have been started only during the last years of the 20th century because before it wasn't possible to investigate the 10−4 M region, so it is possible that during the next years new theories will be born.

Extensions of the theory
A number of approaches have been proposed to extend the validity of the law to concentration ranges as commonly encountered in chemistry

One such extended Debye–Hückel equation is given by:

The effective hydrated radius of the ion, a is the radius of the ion and its closely bound water molecules. Large ions and less highly charged ions bind water less tightly and have smaller hydrated radii than smaller, more highly charged ions. Typical values are 3Å for ions such as H+, Cl−, CN−, and HCOO−.

The extended Debye–Hückel equation provides accurate results for μ ≤ 0.1. For solutions of greater ionic strengths, the Pitzer equations should be used. In these solutions the activity coefficient may actually increase with ionic strength.

The Debye–Hückel equation cannot be used in the solutions of surfactants where the presence of micelles influences on the electrochemical properties of the system (even rough judgement overestimates γ for ~50%).

See also
 Strong electrolyte
 Weak electrolyte
 Ionic atmosphere
 Debye–Hückel theory
 Poisson–Boltzmann equation

Notes

References
 
 
 
 
 Malatesta, F., and Zamboni, R. (1997). Activity and osmotic coefficients from the EMF of liquid membrane cells, VI – ZnSO4, MgSO4, CaSO4 and SrSO4 in water at 25 °C. Journal of Solution Chemistry, 26, 791–815.

External links
 For easy calculation of activity coefficients in (non-micellar) solutions, check out the IUPAC open project Aq-solutions (freeware)'''.
 Gold Book definition

Analytical chemistry
Electrochemical equations
Peter Debye